XHLL-TDT is a television station in Villahermosa, Tabasco, Mexico. XHLL broadcasts on virtual channel 6 (physical channel 33). The transmitter site is co-located with the studios of radio stations XHVA and XHTAB in Col. Gil y Sáenz in Villahermosa.

History

XHLL began broadcasting on October 12, 1968, with coverage of the opening ceremony of the 1968 Summer Olympics from Mexico City. The station was owned by Televisión de Tabasco, S.A., a joint venture of Fernando and Baltasar Pazos de la Torre (owners of XEVA radio) and Clemente Serna Alvear, owner of Radio Programas de México, with which XEVA was affiliated.

XHLL operated as a local station until July 29, 1972, when the local operation was closed for financial reasons. For more than 47 years, XHLL operated in national network service, airing the XEW network and switching to Canal 5 when Televisa built its own XEW repeater in Villahermosa, XHVIZ-TV, in 1995.

In November 2019, Televisa received authorization to multiplex Canal 5 on the XHVIZ-TDT transmitter beginning January 1, 2020; in its application, it noted that Televisa's affiliation with XHLL-TDT would end on December 31, 2019. The IFT assigned XHLL virtual channel 8 to use when Canal 5 moved to XHVIZ. As a result of the lost program source, the station began broadcasting a time lapse loop of the Pazos studio and transmitter building on January 1.

Shortly after, XHLL affiliated with Multimedios Televisión. The virtual channel changed to channel 6 to match the programming in 2021.

References

Television stations in Tabasco
Television channels and stations established in 1968
1968 establishments in Mexico